Emily Kwok (born 5 October 1980) is a Canadian submission grappler and 3rd degree black belt Brazilian jiu-jitsu (BJJ) instructor. A former mixed martial arts (MMA) competitor with a perfect record, Kwok is the first Canadian woman to receive a Black Belt in Brazilian Jiu-Jitsu and the first to become World Champion. As one of the first females to rise to prominence, Kwok is widely regarded as an early pioneer of the BJJ scene in North America.

Career 
Emily R. Kwok was born on 5 October 1980, in Aomori, Japan, from a Japanese mother and a Chinese father, when she was just a baby her family immigrated to Canada. During her late teens in Vancouver Kwok discovered Sambo then started training in Brazilian jiu-jitsu (BJJ) in 2001, complemented by Wing Chun and kickboxing, before moving to New York city. She received her blue belt from Renzo Gracie, purple from Takashi Ouchi and brown and black belt from Ricardo Almeida. As a brown belt in the brown/black category, Kwok won the 2007 final defeating black belt Luciana Dias with a score of 17—0 becoming the middleweight World Champion. Kwok became the first Canadian woman to receive a Black Belt in Brazilian Jiu-Jitsu and in 2007 the first to become Brazilian jiu-jitsu World Champion.

Throughout her competitive career Kwok also fought has an amateur and professional MMA fighter for the Smackgirl organisation in Korea and Japan. Affiliated with Marcelo Garcia, Kwok founded Princeton BJJ with Art Keintz in 2010 in Princeton, New Jersey where she trains and teaches, she has also been an early organizer of Women's Grappling Camp.
Kwok has been called "a legend ahead of her time" and is widely regarded as a true BJJ pioneer paving the way for women in the sport. In 2018 she won the World Master Championship in Las Vegas. In April 2022 Kwok returned to competition winning gold at the 2022 Pan Championship in the Master 3 / middleweight division. Kwok won gold in January at the 2023 Brazilian Jiu-Jitsu European Championship competing in Master 3 / middleweight division.

Brazilian Jiu-Jitsu competitive summary 
Main Achievements:
 IBJJF World Champion (2007)
 IBJJF World No-GI Champion (2010)
 2nd Place IBJJF World No-GI Championship (2007 / 2011)
 2nd Place IBJJF American Nationals Championship (2009)
 3rd place IBJJF World Champion (2010)
 3rd Place IBJJF Pans Championship (2008, 2012)

Instructor lineage 
Mitsuyo Maeda > Carlos Gracie > Helio Gracie > Carlos Gracie Jr. > Renzo Gracie > Ricardo Almeida > Emily Kwok

Notes

References 

Canadian practitioners of Brazilian jiu-jitsu
Living people
1980 births
People awarded a black belt in Brazilian jiu-jitsu
World Brazilian Jiu-Jitsu Championship medalists
World No-Gi Brazilian Jiu-Jitsu Championship medalists
Brazilian jiu-jitsu world champions (women)
Female Brazilian jiu-jitsu practitioners
Canadian submission wrestlers
Canadian female mixed martial artists
Mixed martial artists utilizing Brazilian jiu-jitsu
Brazilian jiu-jitsu practitioners who have competed in MMA (women)